The short-tailed pipefish (Microphis brachyurus)  is a species of fish in the family Syngnathidae. It is found in fresh and brackish waters from Sri Lanka and India east to southern Japan and the Society Islands. It inhabits places with little or no current in rivers, streams and estuaries.

It formerly included three subspecies, but these are now regarded as separate species: Microphis aculeatus of the East Atlantic region, Microphis lineatus of the West Atlantic and Caribbean regions, and Microphis millepunctatus of the Western Indian Ocean region.

References

 http://australianmuseum.net.au/short-tail-river-pipefish-microphis-brachyurus-bleeker-1853

brachyurus
Fish described in 1842